Hamond may refer to:

People
Andrew Hamond (disambiguation), more than one person
Anthony Hamond (died 1743) of South Wootton, near King's Lynn, Norfolk, husband of the sister of Sir Robert Walpole, KG
Graham Hamond (disambiguation), more than one person
Philip Hamond (1883–1953), British Army officer

Ships

See also
Hamand (disambiguation)
Hammond (disambiguation)